Two Bavarians in Bonn is a 1962 West German comedy film directed by Rudolf Lubowski and starring Beppo Brem, Hans Fitz and Lucie Englisch. It is the third and final sequel to the 1956 film Two Bavarians in St. Pauli. This time the action is shifted to the German political capital Bonn.

Cast
 Beppo Brem as Bürgermeister Vinzenz Kreithuber
 Hans Fitz as Wirt Josef Prechtl
 Lucie Englisch as Kreithuberin
 Hannelore Bollmann as Gaby
 Thomas Reiner as Regierungsrat Dr. Bodo Blücher
 Elke Arendt as Inge Schulz
 Karl Tischlinger as Domberger
 Rolf von Nauckhoff as Familienminister
 Erni Singerl as Stasi
 Hans Stadtmüller as Moser
 Thomas Alder as Dr. Frank
 Rosel Günther as Köchin
 Werner Finck as Atomminister

References

Bibliography

External links 
 

1962 films
West German films
German comedy films
1962 comedy films
1960s German-language films
Films directed by Rudolf Lubowski
1960s German films